Treville may refer to the following places:

Treville, Herefordshire, a former civil parish in England
Treville, Piedmont, a municipality in Italy
, Italy, in Castelfranco Veneto
Trevelin (also ), a town in the Welsh settlement in Chubut Province, Argentina
Tréville, France

Treville can also refer to the following persons:

M. de Tréville a fictional character in The Three Musketeers based on Jean-Armand du Peyrer, Count of Troisvilles (or Tréville)
Olivia De Treville, Slovakian pornographic actor
Louis-René Levassor de Latouche Tréville, French admiral and three French ships Latouche-Tréville named for him
Georges Tréville, French actor and director
Ulla Tréville, owner of Sweden-based translations agency Treville Translations, President of National Union of Teachers in Täby, Sweden.